William Howard "Cap" Edwards (September 5, 1888 – November 23, 1944) was a National Football League coach and player in American football's earliest years. In the early 20th century, football in America was just beginning to catch on, with professional teams popping up in numerous cities, and at the time college football was more popular.

Edwards attended and graduated from the University of Notre Dame, where he played football as an guard. His professional coaching career was short-lived, but nonetheless noteworthy as he coached in the pioneering days of football with such greats as Jim Thorpe and Guy Chamberlin. He first coached the Canton Bulldogs in 1921, which ended in a 5–2–3 record. In 1923 Edwards coached the Cleveland Indians, with a 3–1–3 record, followed by a 5–8–1 record as coach of the Cleveland Bulldogs.

Edwards also served as the head football coach at West Virginia Wesleyan College in Buckhannon, West Virginia from 1910 to 1911.

References

External links
 

1888 births
1944 deaths
American football guards
Canton Bulldogs coaches
Canton Bulldogs players
Cleveland Bulldogs players
Cleveland Indians (NFL 1923) players
Cleveland Indians-Bulldogs coaches
Notre Dame Fighting Irish football players
Toledo Maroons players
West Virginia Wesleyan Bobcats football coaches
Players of American football from Missouri